The Gezira Center for Modern Art, also known as the Egyptian Modern Art Museum,  is an art museum for modern and contemporary art, located in Cairo, Egypt. It is part of the National Cultural Centre with the Cairo Opera House, on Gezira Island,  just across the Nile on Qasr el-Nil Street west of downtown Cairo.

Collections
The museum displays more than 10,000 paintings and sculptures that show the development of the Egyptian art movement from the early 20th century pioneers through contemporary artists' works. There is a permanent collection of works by renowned Egyptian artists, such as: Mahmoud Sa'id, Ragheb Ayad, Mohammed Naghi, Gazbia Sirry, Inji Eflatoun, Tahia Halim, Abdel Hadi el-Gazzar and Ahmed Morsi. It also has a collection of works by Ibrahim Mohammed Khalil, one of the pioneering innovators of modern Arabic calligraphy in Egypt.

The museum has been a participant in the Cairo Biennale.

The Mahmoud Khalil Museum in Giza displays works by major international impressionist art painters, including Monet, Van Gogh and Gauguin.

See also
El Sawy Culture Wheel
Museum of Islamic Ceramics
Index: Egyptian artists
Note:
The similarly named but separate modern art institution, the Museum of Modern Art in Egypt, is in Port Said, Egypt, near the confluence of the Suez Canal and the Mediterranean.

References

Museums in Cairo
Art museums and galleries in Egypt
Modern art museums
Gezira Island
Contemporary art galleries in Africa